Chahar Qash (also Romanized as Chahār Qāsh; also known as Chahār Qāsh-e Salaḩshūr) is a village in Susan-e Gharbi Rural District, Susan District, Izeh County, Khuzestan Province, Iran. At the 2006 census, its population was 91, in 15 families.

References 

Populated places in Izeh County